Alex Friedmann (26 September 1918 – 20 May 1997) was a Danish footballer. He played in nine matches for the Denmark national football team from 1937 to 1942.

References

External links
 

1918 births
1997 deaths
Danish men's footballers
Denmark international footballers
Place of birth missing
Association footballers not categorized by position